Ambley Wood is a   Local Nature Reserve in Gillingham in Kent. It is owned and managed by Medway Council.

The site has ancient woodland with typical woodland flora.

There is access from Ambley Road

References

Local Nature Reserves in Kent